Bang Bang Bang is the 1999 album from The Nitty Gritty Dirt Band. The title track reached number 52 on the US Country chart. The track "Down the Road" was originally recorded by Mac McAnally, and would later be a No. 1 in 2008 when he re-recorded it with Kenny Chesney.

The album was originally recorded for Rising Tide Records, which closed prior to the album's release. It was then moved to Decca Records, which also closed. The lead single, which was the title track, originally charted through release on Rising Tide, and charted again after DreamWorks released the album.

Critical reception
A review in Billboard was favorable, calling the songs "entertainingly quirky" and praising the musicianship.

Track listing

Personnel 
 Jeff Hanna – vocals, electric and acoustic guitars, slide guitar, 12 string guitar, washboard
 Jimmy Ibbotson – vocals, acoustic and electric guitar, mandolin
 Jimmie Fadden – drums, harmonica
 Bob Carpenter – vocals, piano, Hammond B-3, accordion

References 
All information is from the album liner notes unless otherwise noted.

Nitty Gritty Dirt Band albums
1999 albums
DreamWorks Records albums
Albums produced by Josh Leo
Albums produced by Emory Gordy Jr.